Pyrausta thibetalis is a moth in the family Crambidae. It was described by Oberthür in 1886. It is found in China (Sichuan).

References

Moths described in 1886
thibetalis
Moths of Asia